Dalar can refer to:

Ab-i-Dalar, a village in Zanjan Province, Iran
Dalar, Armenia, a village
Delal sauce or dalar, a condiment from Northern Iran

See also
Swedish riksdaler, a form of outdated Swedish currency